Yevdokiya is a 1961 Soviet melodrama film directed by Tatyana Lioznova.

Plot 
The film tells about the worker Yevdokim and his wife Yevdokiya, who live in a small town in the province and raise foster children. Their life is full of bright passions and moments.

Cast 
 Lyudmila Khityaeva as Yevdokiya
 Nikolai Lebedev  as Yevdokim 
 Alevtina Rumyantseva as Natalia
 Lyuba Basova as Natalia in childhood
 Olga Narovchatova as Natalia in youth
 Vladimir Ivashov as Pavel Chernyshev
 Yevgeni Anufriyev as Andrey
 Aleksandr Barsov
 Vera Altayskaya as Anna Shkapidar
 Valentin Zubkov as Porokhin
 Ivan Ryzhov as  Ivan Yegorovich Shestyorkin

References

External links 
 

1961 films
1960s Russian-language films
Soviet romantic drama films
Gorky Film Studio films
Films directed by Tatyana Lioznova
Soviet black-and-white films
Films based on novellas